Yon Hyong-muk, also spelt Yong Hyong-muk (November 3, 1931 – October 22, 2005), was a long-serving politician in North Korea and at the height of his career the most powerful person in that country outside the Kim family. He was Prime Minister of North Korea from 1988 to 1992.

He was born in Kyongwon County and had a strong revolutionary background in his family. He was educated locally and employed as a farm worker. Yon was educated in Czechoslovakia and by the 1950s, he was firmly established within the hierarchy of the Workers' Party of Korea. In 1967 he was selected as a deputy to the Supreme People's Assembly.

During the 1970s, Yon further advanced in the Party and by the middle 1980s he was regarded as the fourth most powerful person in North Korea after Kim Il-sung, Kim Jong-il, and veteran marshal and defence minister O Jin-u. He was a candidate member of the Politburo from the early 1980s and became Prime Minister of North Korea in 1989. During this era, Yon served as Minister of Heavy Industry and this consolidated his role in the North's large armaments sector.

In this period, as Kim Il-sung and O Jin-u were both already past eighty, Yon took an important role in relations between North and South Korea. He worked hard in this field as Prime Minister and was regarded as the chief negotiator behind the Agreement on Reconciliation, Non-aggression and Exchanges and Cooperation between the South and the North (also known as the "South-North Basic Agreement") of 1991. At the time he called it "the most valuable achievement ever made between the South and North Korean authorities." For the rest of the 1990s, Yon was the chief figure behind efforts to reconcile the two Koreas.

By the 2000s, Yon was declining in health and his role in North Korean politics had become largely ceremonial by the time he died - presumably of pancreatic cancer for which he had received treatment in Russia in 2004 at the well protected Central Clinical Hospital.

Yon was a recipient of the Order of Kim Il-sung, Hero of Labor and other awards.

Death and funeral

Yon died on 22 October 2005. A funeral committee chaired by Jo Myong-rok was appointed. Its members were:

 Jo Myong-rok
 Kim Yong-nam
 Pak Pong-ju
 Kim Yong-chun
 Kim Il-chol
 Jon Pyong-ho
 Ri Yong-mu
 Choe Thae-bok
 Yang Hyong-sop
 Choe Yong-rim
 Kim Ki-nam
 Kim Jung-rin
 Hong Song-nam
 Kwak Pom-gi
 Ro Tu-chol
 Jon Sung-hun
 Kim Yong-dae
 Ryu Mi-yong
 Paek Se-pong
 Pak Yong-sok
 Pak Nam-gi
 Ri Kwang-ho
 
 Ri Yong-chol
 Ri Je-kang
 Ri Jae-il
 Ju Kyu-chang
 Kim Jong-im
 Kim Yang-kon
 Ju Sang-song
 Ri Myong-su
 Hyon Chol-hae
 Kim Ki-son
 Pak Jae-kyong
 Kim Yang-chom
 Pak Sung-won
 Choe Pu-il
 Ri Thae-won
 Sim Sang-dae
 Ri Thae-nam
 Kim Phyong-hae
 Kim Rak-hui
 Ro Pae-kwon
 Kim Kyong-ho
 Pak To-chun
 Kim Kyong-ho
 Ryom Sun-gil
 Kang Chang-uk
 Pak Sun-hui

Works

References 

1931 births
2005 deaths
People from Kyongwon County
Prime Ministers of North Korea
North Korean military personnel
Deaths from pancreatic cancer
Deaths from cancer in North Korea
Recipients of the Order of Kim Il-sung
Alternate members of the 6th Politburo of the Workers' Party of Korea
Members of the 6th Secretariat of the Workers' Party of Korea
Members of the 5th Central Committee of the Workers' Party of Korea
Members of the 6th Central Committee of the Workers' Party of Korea